Chelsea Street Bridge may refer to:

 Chelsea Street Bridge (Boston)
 Chelsea Street Bridge (Royalton, Vermont)